Henri-Joseph de Lannoy (also Henricus Josephus de Lannoy; 1712 – ) was a Flemish luthier and a crafter of string instruments such as violins, violas and cellos. His instruments are recognized as key examples of 18th century violin making in Flanders, characterized by their fine work and golden-yellow varnish.

Biography 
Henri-Joseph de Lannoy started at age 18 as an apprentice violin maker in Borgendael, Brussels. After completing his apprenticeship, de Lannoy worked in several cities. From 1740 to 1752, he worked in Lille, followed by a period in Ghent (1752-1760) and The Hague (1760-1761). He successively travelled to Rotterdam, Antwerp and Mons, while expanding his knowledge of violin making. From time to time he returned to Brussels, where he finally settled with his brother Jean-Joseph-André de Lannoy in the year 1767.

He began working for the Brussels Court around 1784, as suggested by a letter he sent to the Finance Council with the aim of taking over the post of the late E. Michiels. In this same letter, he wrote that he had been a luthier for more than 50 years. Shortly before this letter, on the death of Michiels, Henri-Jacques de Croes highly recommended de Lannoy at the Council of Finance, calling him the "... one and only good worker in this kind of craft I know...". He would be employed by the Court until 1794, becoming the last luthier of the Royal Chapel of the Austrian Netherlands.

References

External links
 La lutherie à Bruxelles aux XVIIe et XVIIIe siècles, Benoît J. Debert, 2014.

People of the Austrian Netherlands
Flemish luthiers
1712 births
1790s deaths